Brian West may refer to:

Brian West (soccer) (born 1978), American soccer player
Brian West (musician) (born 1971), Canadian musician, writer, producer, engineer

See also
Bryan West (born 1948), English rugby player